Engine Company No. 3 is located in Hoboken, Hudson County, New Jersey, United States. The firehouse was designed by Charles Fall and was built in 1892. The firehouse was added to the National Register of Historic Places on March 30, 1984. The firehouse currently houses Engine Company 2 and Ladder Company 2 of the Hoboken Fire Department.

Construction 
The building is a two-story building with a fire watch tower designed by Hoboken Architect Charles Fall. The foundation of the building is field stone and the exterior walls are brick with sandstone trim. The roof is presumed to have been originally slate, however this has since been replaced. The masons were M. Foley & Son and the carpenter was A.W. Clayton.

See also
National Register of Historic Places listings in Hudson County, New Jersey

References

Buildings and structures in Hoboken, New Jersey
Fire stations completed in 1892
Fire stations on the National Register of Historic Places in New Jersey
National Register of Historic Places in Hudson County, New Jersey
New Jersey Register of Historic Places